The El Salvador national football team represents El Salvador in international football, and is governed by the Salvadoran Football Federation (FESFUT).

In 1899, two teams from Santa Ana and San Salvador met for the first known football game in El Salvador. The national team's first match was played in September 1921, when they were invited to participate in a tournament to celebrate 100 years of Central American Independence.

El Salvador has made two FIFA World Cup appearances: first in 1970 and again in 1982, but have never progressed beyond the first stage of a finals tournament. They were the 1943 CCCF champions, and finished in second-place in the 1941 and 1961 championships. They have competed in the CONCACAF regional tournaments fourteen times, finishing as runners-up in 1963 and 1981. La Selecta also competes in the biennial UNCAF Nations Cup, the Pan American Games, the Olympics, and have won two gold medals in the Central American and Caribbean Games.

The Estadio Cuscatlán, also known as "El Coloso de Montserrat" and "La Catedral del Espectáculo", is the official home stadium of the El Salvador national football team. Since 2017, the national team has had a kit sponsorship contract with England-based supplier Umbro. Raúl Díaz Arce is the all-time top-scorer for the national team, with 39 goals, while Darwin Cerén has the most caps, with 89 appearances.

History

Beginnings
Salvadoran football had its origins in the city of Santa Ana, on a field called "Campo Marte". The first recorded game took place on 16 July 1899 between players from Santa Ana and San Salvador. Both teams had several foreign players from England who are credited with introducing football to El Salvador. The home team won the game 2–0.

Although El Salvador played a few games in the early part of the twentieth century, they did not form an official national team until 1921, when players such as José Pablo Huezo, Carlos Escobar Leiva or Santiago Barrachina revolutionised football in the country.  In September 1921, El Salvador were invited to Guatemala to take part in the Independence Centenary Games, to celebrate 100 years of Central American Independence. The tournament was between Guatemala, Honduras, Costa Rica, and El Salvador. The Guatemalans and Costa Ricans had more experience than the Salvadorans and Hondurans. It was a knockout tournament with Guatemala playing Honduras and El Salvador playing Costa Rica. El Salvador, wearing white shorts and black shirts, used a classic 2–3–5 scheme with their team consisting of Carlos Escobar Leyva; Spanish resident Santiago Barrachina, José Pablo Huezo; Benjamín Sandoval, Emilio Dawson, and Frenchman Emilio Detruit; Víctor Recinos, brothers Guillermo and José E. Alcaine, Guillermo Sandoval and Enrique Lindo. By half-time Costa Rica led 3–0, and at the final whistle, after two 40-minute halves, won 7–0.

El Salvador's other matches in the 1920s were friendlies against Costa Rica and Honduras. They lost their first friendly 3–0 against the national football team of Costa Rica, while the second and third ended in a 1–0 loss and 0–0 draw against Honduras. On 7 December 1928, El Salvador recorded their first ever win, 5–0 over Honduras, the team that would become their traditional rivals, with Gustavo "Taviche" Marroquín scoring every goal. The game was played at Campo Marte, San Salvador, and was also the first time the team had scored in an international match.

1930s
In the early 1930s, El Salvador appointed their first official national coach, the American Mark Scott Thompson, in preparation for the 1930 Central American and Caribbean Games in Havana. El Salvador finished in fourth place at the games. The Salvadoran Football Federation was founded in 1935. By this time, El Salvador were coached by the Spaniard, Pablo Ferre Elías. The 1935 Central American and Caribbean Games took place in El Salvador's new government-funded Estadio Flor Blanca, at that time the biggest stadium in the country. The Salvadoran squad consisted of Edmundo Majano as goalkeeper; Tobias Rivera and Raúl Castro in defence; Américo Gonzalez and Napoleon Cañas as midfielders; and Álex Morales, Rogelio Aviles, Fidel Quintanilla, Miguel "Americano" Cruz, and Andrés Hernández as strikers. Previously the national team had worn black and white striped jerseys and this was the first time they turned out in a blue strip. The team finished in third place as bronze medal winners.

In 1938, the Salvadoran Football Federation became affiliates of FIFA. El Salvador participated in the 1938 Central American and Caribbean Games, hosted in Panama, which were won by Mexico, with Costa Rica in second place. El Salvador won two and lost three of their five matches. A match for third place against Colombia was cancelled because of the bad state of the players, and El Salvador finished in fourth place.

1940s
On 26 April 1940, the first national football federation was approved, with Dr. Luis Rivas Palacios as president. In 1941, the first Central American and Caribbean Championship (CCCF) took place in Costa Rica, organised by CONCACAF, the international governing body for football in North America, Central America and the Caribbean. El Salvador competed alongside Costa Rica, Curaçao, Nicaragua and Panama. El Salvador were runners-up, recording two wins, one draw and one loss.

The 1943 CCCF Championship took place in San Salvador with the participation of Costa Rica, Guatemala and Nicaragua. El Salvador were coached by the former national player Américo González. El Salvador and Guatemala finished with the same number of points, Guatemala failed to attend a deciding play-off, resulting in El Salvador winning their first international title. El Salvador's 10‒1 win over Nicaragua set the team's record for the most goals scored in a single game. It was also the second time a Salvadoran player (Miguel "Americano" Cruz) had scored five goals in a match. El Salvador defended their title in the 1946 CCCF Championship in Costa Rica alongside six other participants and finished in third place, winning three matches and losing two. In the 1948 CCCF Championship, hosted in Guatemala, Costa Rica won the championship for the third time, with El Salvador finishing in fifth place.

1950s
El Salvador did not participate in qualification for the World Cups in 1954, 1958, 1962 and 1966. During these years El Salvador had a good squad, including goalkeeper Manuel "Tamalón" Garay, Rafael "Chapuda" Reyes, Conrado Miranda, Miguel "Americano" Cruz, Rafael Corado and Mando Rivas.

In the group stage of the 1950 Central American and Caribbean Games in Mexico, El Salvador recorded two wins, one draw and one loss. They began the final round by beating Curaçao 3–1, but lost their other two matches, leaving them in fifth place. In 1953, El Salvador took part in their fifth CCCF Championship. The hosts, Costa Rica, became champions for the fourth time, and El Salvador finished in fifth place again.

At the 1954 Central American and Caribbean Games, El Salvador won their second international title under the Carbilio Tomasino, with a team consisting of Yohalmo Aurora, Manuel "Tamalón" Garay, Hugo Moreno, Armando Larín, Luis Regalado, Conrado Miranda, Fernando Barrios, Ramón "Pezote" Chávez, José Hernández, Mario Montoya, Juan Francisco "Cariota" Barraza, Ricardo "Chilenito" Valencia, Alfredo "Baiza" Ruano, and Obdulio Hernández. They began with a 2–2 draw against Colombia, and then beat Cuba 3–1, Mexico 3–2 and Panama 1–0 with a goal by Barraza. The win against Mexico, with two goals from Montoya and one from Valencia, was the first by a Central American team against Mexico.

In the 1955 CCCF Championship, hosted in Honduras, Costa Rica became champions for the fifth time, with El Salvador finishing fourth. El Salvador did not participate in the 1957 and 1960 CCCF Championships.

1960s
El Salvador returned to participate in the 1961 CCCF Championship, hosted in Costa Rica, alongside nine other national teams. El Salvador were placed in a four-team first group with Honduras, the Netherlands Antilles, and Nicaragua, which they topped with two wins and a draw. In the final round they finished in second place behind Costa Rica, who won their seventh CCCF Championship. Afterwards the tournament was dissolved and replaced with the CONCACAF Championship.

In the first CONCACAF Championship, in 1963, El Salvador hosted both the qualification round and the final tournament.  Costa Rica became the first champions, and El Salvador finished as runners-up. In 1964, the Chilean Hernán Carrasco Vivanco, who would later revolutionize Salvadoran football, became the coach of the national team. He led the national team for the first time at the 1965 CONCACAF Championship, hosted in Guatemala, where they won two games, drew one and lost two, finishing in fourth place. In 1966, El Salvador took part in the Central American and Caribbean Games for the sixth time, in Puerto Rico. They finished in fourth place.

In 1968, El Salvador qualified for the Olympic Games for the first time. They lost 4–0 to Hungary, 3–1 to Israel, and drew 1–1 with Ghana. The coach at this time was Rigoberto Guzmán.

Gregorio Bundio and his assistant José Santacolomba coached the team in the qualifying stages for the 1970 World Cup. This was the first time that El Salvador participated in World Cup qualifying. As hosts, Mexico qualified automatically, leaving one further qualification spot available for the CONCACAF region. El Salvador won Group 3, winning three and losing one. They qualified for a play-off against their traditional rivals, the Group 2 winners Honduras. The first game, on 8 June 1969 in the Honduran capital of Tegucigalpa, was won 1–0 by the home team and was followed by crowd violence. El Salvador won the second game 3–0 a week later in San Salvador, which was followed by even greater violence. A play-off match took place in Mexico City on 26 June, which El Salvador won 3–2 after extra time. On 14 July, as a result of existing tensions being exacerbated by these matches, the two countries began the hundred-hour-long conflict known as the Football War. As a result, El Salvador and Honduras were both disqualified from entering 1969 CONCACAF Championship qualification.

In the deciding World Cup qualifier, El Salvador faced Haiti. El Salvador won the away leg 2–1, with goals from Elmer Acevedo and Mauricio "Pipo" Rodríguez, but lost the second leg 3–0 at home. El Salvador finally won the play-off on 8 October with a goal by Juan Ramón "Mon" Martínez in extra time, allowing them to qualify for the World Cup finals at the first attempt.

"El Pajaro Picón Picón" was a Colombian song written by Eliseo Herrera which was very popular in El Salvador during the World Cup qualifying stages. During a radio show, Mauricio Bojórquez parodied the song, which he named "Arriba con la Selección". That parody became so famous that it became the official anthem of the El Salvador national football team.

1970s

In the World Cup finals El Salvador were drawn into a group with Belgium, Mexico and the Soviet Union. El Salvador lost their first game 3–0 to Belgium in Mexico City on 3 June. The second match, against Mexico on 7 June, was marred by a controversial call near the end of the first half, with the score still at 0–0. The Egyptian referee Ali Kandil appeared to signal for a free kick to El Salvador in their own half. However, a Mexican player took the kick, passing to Javier Valdivia, who scored. The Salvadoran players protested vigorously, to the extent of physically jostling the Bermudan linesman, Keith Dunstan, but the goal was allowed to stand. El Salvador restarted the game by kicking the ball into the crowd in protest. They eventually lost 4–0. The team's third game took place on 10 June, with El Salvador losing 2–0 to the Soviet Union to finish at the bottom of Group A.

El Salvador advanced from the first round of 1971 CONCACAF Championship qualification by beating Nicaragua 4–2 on aggregate. In the second round, they withdrew from their play-off against Honduras, allowing their opponents to qualify by default. The national team also took part in the 1973 CONCACAF Championship qualification, which doubled as qualification for the 1974 World Cup, but they did not advance to the final stage after they were eliminated by Guatemala 2–0 on aggregate (1–0, 1–0). The team was managed by Hector D'Angelo.

El Salvador participated at the Pan American Games for the first time in 1975 in Mexico. They began with a 4–1 win against Nicaragua on 14 October, with a hat-trick from "Pajarito" Huezo, on the début of Francisco "Paco" Jovel. They then lost 2–0 to Brazil and drew 0–0 against Costa Rica, with "Pelé" Zapata missing a penalty. They finished in third place in Group D and failed to advance to the next round.

In 1977 CONCACAF Championship qualification, El Salvador finished second in their group, behind Guatemala and ahead of Costa Rica and Panama, to qualify for the final tournament, hosted in Mexico. They finished in third place, behind Haiti and Mexico, with the hosts winning the tournament. El Salvador participated in the 1978 Central American and Caribbean Games, hosted in Colombia. Cuba were crowned champions for the fourth time and El Salvador finished ninth.

1980s
El Salvador played Costa Rica, Guatemala, Honduras and Panama in 1981 CONCACAF Championship qualification, in a home-and-away round-robin group with the top two teams advancing to the final tournament. El Salvador and Honduras finished with equal points at the top of the group, with Honduras winning the group on goal difference. Once again the finals doubled up as World Cup qualification, this time for the 1982 World Cup, with the top two of the six teams qualifying. Going into the final matches, El Salvador had four points and were in third place on goal difference, with Mexico and Canada both also having four points, behind Honduras with seven. On 19 November 1981, El Salvador beat Haiti 1–0, with a penalty by Norberto Huezo. On 21 November, Canada drew 2–2 with Cuba and were eliminated. In the decisive match the following day, Honduras and Mexico drew 0–0, meaning El Salvador qualified for the World Cup for the second time.

El Salvador took a 20-man squad to Spain, two players short of the maximum number allowed, as a controversial cost–saving measure. They were coached by "Pipo" Rodríguez. In their first match on 15 June in Elche, they were defeated 10–1 by Hungary, a World Cup Finals record margin of victory. A silver lining was that Luis Ramírez Zapata scored the country's first World Cup goal during the game, albeit when the Salvadorans were already 5–0 down. When Zapata scored, some Salvadorans cried out not to celebrate the goal because it might make the Hungarians angry and encourage them to score more. Displaying much-improved levels of organisation and commitment, El Salvador lost 1–0 to Belgium on 19 June in Elche and 2–0 to the world champions, Argentina, on 23 June in Alicante.

There were several reasons the tournament went so badly for El Salvador. First of all, their reduced squad meant that they omitted Gilberto Quinteros and Miguel González. According to Luis Guevara Mora, the 20-year-old goalkeeper, the Salvadoran Football Federation decided to take members of the Federation, as well as their friends and family, and spent so much money they could not afford to bring a full squad. The team took many stops throughout Europe under the direction of the Federation, taking three days to arrive in Spain and were the last team to do so. Once they arrived, there was more trouble. Adidas sent four white and three blue uniforms for each player, but only three white and one blue arrived. The remaining uniforms were said to have been taken away by the association. They decided to play with the white uniform and keep the blue as a keepsake. Next, someone stole the balls that the team needed to train with. The day before the match against Hungary, the Hungarians had the 25 balls the organization had given them while El Salvador had none and were unable to train. To make things even worse, El Salvador had never seen Hungary play, and the only knowledge that they had about the team was an outdated video that they had bought. On the field there were more problems. Hungary's fourth goal was caused by Francisco Jovel's sudden deafness after he had received a heavy blow on the cheek. When Guevara Mora called to him to stop a ball, the defender did not hear him, and the ball went past Jovel in front of the net. After the match, the Salvadoran squad had a tense meeting with the coaching staff and Federation. The coach was dismissed immediately and the matches against Belgium and Argentina were managed by players Jovel, Huezo and Fagoaga. Although the tournament overall was a big disappointment, Jorge "Mágico" González was considered by the national and international press as the best player, and he stayed in Spain to play for Cádiz CF and Real Valladolid.

In 1985 CONCACAF Championship qualification, El Salvador beat Puerto Rico 8–0 on aggregate (5–0, 3–0) to qualify for the final tournament. They were placed in a group with Honduras and Suriname, with the top team advancing. They finished second in the group with five points, one point behind Honduras. In 1989 CONCACAF Championship qualification they eliminated the Netherlands Antilles 6–0 on aggregate (1–0, 5–0). El Salvador finished last, with just two points, in the round-robin final tournament.

1990s
At a CONCACAF congress, held in Guatemala on 26 January 1991, a new tournament, called the UNCAF Nations Cup, was conceived for Central American teams. The inaugural tournament was hosted in 1991, hosted by Costa Rica. The tournament also doubled as qualification for the CONCACAF Gold Cup, a new tournament which replaced the CONCACAF Championship. In qualification, La Selecta defeated Nicaragua 5–2 on aggregate (3–2, 2–0) and advanced to the final tournament. In the finals, they played three games, drawing one and losing two, finishing in last place and failing to advance to the 1991 CONCACAF Gold Cup. The 1993 UNCAF Nations Cup once again served as qualification to the Gold Cup, this time for the 1993 CONCACAF Gold Cup. Coached by Jorge Vieira, La Selecta advanced to the final tournament automatically. There they played three games, once again drawing one and losing two to finish last and fail to advance to the Gold Cup.

In 1994 World Cup qualification, El Salvador eliminated Nicaragua 10–1 on aggregate (5–0, 5–1) in the first round, then finished first in a group composed of Bermuda (0–1, 4–1), Canada (1–1, 3–2), and Jamaica (2–0, 2–1) in the second round. In the third round, El Salvador began with a win against Mexico at home, but lost their next four games, including two defeats against Canada. They beat Honduras 2–1 at home in their final game, but finished third in the group and were eliminated.

El Salvador hosted the 1995 UNCAF Nations Cup. In their first round, they topped a group containing Costa Rica and Belize, and lost 1–0 to Guatemala in the knockout round. They won the third place match 2–1 against Costa Rica and advanced to the 1996 CONCACAF Gold Cup alongside Guatemala and the tournament winners, Honduras. This was their first appearance at the Gold Cup. At the finals of the 1996 Gold Cup, El Salvador defeated Trinidad and Tobago 3–2, with goals from Raúl Díaz Arce (2) and Ronald Cerritos in their first game, but then lost 2–0 to the United States and did not advance from the first round.

At the 1997 UNCAF Nations Cup, hosted in Guatemala, El Salvador lost 3–0 to Honduras in their first match but defeated Panama 2–0 in their second. In the second group stage they finished in third place, losing 1–0 to both Guatemala and Costa Rica, and drawing 0–0 against Honduras. They advanced to the 1998 CONCACAF Gold Cup, hosted in the United States. El Salvador were coached by Kiril Dojcinovski. In the group stage, they drew 0–0 with Guatemala, and lost to Brazil (4–0) and Jamaica (2–0).

In 1998 World Cup qualification, El Salvador received a bye to the third round, where they were drawn into a group with Canada, Cuba, and Panama. They finished second behind Canada and advanced to the six-team final round. El Salvador finished in fifth place with two wins, four draws, and four defeats. This was the closest they had come to qualifying for a World Cup since 1982.

At the 1999 UNCAF Nations Cup, hosted in Costa Rica, El Salvador drew 1–1 with Guatemala and defeated Nicaragua 1–0 in the first round, with Magdonio Corrales scoring in both games. In the second group stage, they lost 3–1 to Honduras, 1–0 Guatemala and 4–0 to Costa Rica to finish bottom of the group, and failed to advance to the 2000 CONCACAF Gold Cup. They were coached by Mario Peres Ulibarri.

2000s
In 2002 World Cup qualification, El Salvador topped a first round group ahead of Belize and Guatemala, but finished third behind and Jamaica in the second round, and were eliminated.

In the 2001 UNCAF Nations Cup in Honduras, El Salvador topped their first-round group, defeating Nicaragua 3–0, Panama 2–1, and drawing 1–1 with the hosts. In the final round they drew all their games to finish third and advance to the 2002 CONCACAF Gold Cup. They were coached by Carlos Recinos. In the Gold Cup, El Salvador lost their first match in Group A to Mexico (1–0), but defeated Guatemala by the same score, with a goal from Santos Cabrera. This allowed them to advance to the quarter-finals of the Gold Cup for the first time, but they lost 4–0 at that stage to the eventual champions, the United States.

At the 2003 UNCAF Nations Cup in Panama, El Salvador finished third again, with Juan Ramón Paredes as head coach. In the tournament, they won 2–1 against Panama, lost 1–0 to Costa Rica, beat Nicaragua 3–0 and Honduras 1–0, and lost 2–0 against Guatemala. They qualified for the 2003 CONCACAF Gold Cup, where they were drawn into Group C with Martinique and the United States. El Salvador 2–0 lost to the United States but beat Martinique 1–0 with a goal from Marvin González. In the quarter-finals, they were beaten 5–2 by Costa Rica, with three of the seven goals coming from penalty kicks.

The 2006 World Cup qualifiers and 2005 UNCAF Nations Cup, hosted in Guatemala, were both huge disasters for El Salvador. In the former they received a bye to the second round, where they inched past Bermuda 4–3 on aggregate (2–1, 2–2). In the third round they finished last in a group that contained Jamaica, Panama and the United States, with just four points from six games. In the 2005 UNCAF Nations Cup they went out in the first round after losing against Panama (1–0) and Costa Rica (2–1), which meant they also failed to qualify for the 2005 CONCACAF Gold Cup. They were coached by Carlos Cavagnaro.

Coached by Carlos de los Cobos, El Salvador hosted the 2007 UNCAF Nations Cup, and won their first-round group after 2–1 wins over Belize and Nicaragua, and a 0–0 draw with Guatemala. In the semi-finals, they lost 1–0 to the eventual champions, Costa Rica, and finished the tournament in fourth after Guatemala beat them by the same scored in the third place play-off. This allowed them to qualify for the 2007 CONCACAF Gold Cup, where they began with a 2–1 win against Trinidad and Tobago 2–1, with goals from Ramón Sánchez and Dennis Alas. They lost their next two matches against Guatemala (1–0) and the United States (4–0) and exited the tournament.

On 16 June 2007, El Salvador met Hungary at the Estadio Cuscatlán in a repeat of their match at the 1982 World Cup. Many of the same players that had played the original World Cup match played again. The match was drawn 2–2, with goals from Lázár Szentes and Ferenc Csongrádi for Hungary and two goals from Luis Ramírez Zapata for El Salvador.

At the 2009 UNCAF Nations Cup in Honduras, El Salvador finished second in their group after Belize 4–1, drawing 1–1 with Nicaragua and losing 2–0 to Honduras, and Nicaragua. Their semi-final against Costa Rica was called off after 60 minutes, with Costa Rica leading 1–0, when El Salvador were reduced to six players. Alexander Escobar and Eliseo Quintanilla were sent off in the first half, while Deris Umanzor, Rodolfo Zelaya and their goalkeeper Juan José Gómez were injured and had to leave the field after El Salvador had already used their three substitutions. The game was awarded as a 3–0 win to Costa Rica. In the third place play-off, they lost 1–0 to Honduras after a goal by Roger Espinoza. At the 2009 CONCACAF Gold Cup, El Salvador began by beating Costa Rica 2–1, with two goals by Osael Romero. However, they lost 1–0 against Canada and Jamaica and were eliminated.

2010s
In 2010 World Cup qualification El Salvador beat Anguilla 16–0 on aggregate and Panama 3–2 on aggregate in the first two rounds. In their third round group, they finished second in the group behind Costa Rica, ahead of Haiti and Suriname, to advance to the Hexagonal round. Despite drawing against the United States and beating Mexico, El Salvador finished in fifth place and were eliminated. Rudis Corrales was their top scorer in qualification with 8 goals.

On 11 May 2010, the FIFA Emergency Committee suspended the Salvadoran Football Federation (FESFUT) on account of government interference, as the statutes ratified by the FESFUT general assembly in August 2009 had not been entered in the country's official register, and that the government had failed to acknowledge the authority of the Normalisation Committee set up to represent FESFUT. The suspension was lifted by 28 May, allowing La Selecta to participate in international tournaments. El Salvador's under-21 team qualified for the 2010 Central American and Caribbean Games (CAC) in Mayagüez, Puerto Rico. However, CONCACAF decided to suspend football at the 2010 CAC shortly after. El Salvador were also able to participate in the qualifying tournament for the 2012 Summer Olympics.

In the 2011 Copa Centroamericana, the new version of the reorganized UNCAF Nations Cup, El Salvador qualified from their first-round group in second place after defeating Nicaragua 2–0 and Belize 5–2, and losing 2–0 against Panama. In the semi-finals they lost 2–0 to Honduras, and lost 5–4 in a penalty shootout to Panama, after a 0–0 draw. This performance qualified El Salvador for the 2011 CONCACAF Gold Cup. The team was coached by José Luis Rugamas. Forward Rafael Burgos jointly received the Golden Boot with Costa Rica's Marco Ureña, with three goals.

In April 2011, two months before the start of the Gold Cup, José Luis Rugamas was replaced as coach by Rubén Israel. At the Gold Cup, El Salvador began with a 5–0 defeat to Mexico. They drew 1–1 with Costa Rica, with Rodolfo Zelaya's 25-yard free-kick opener being equalised by a Costa Rican goal in injury time, and beat Cuba 6–1 to reach the knockout stage for the first time since 2003. In the quarter-finals they drew 1–1 with Panama, with Panama scoring a controversial equaliser through Luis Tejada one minute from the end. Their coach Israel called the decision an "error of haste." Panama won the penalty shoot-out 5–3.

In 2014 World Cup qualification, El Salvador received a bye to the second round, where they began with a 3–2 win against the Dominican Republic, with goals scored by Rodolfo Zelaya (2) and Christian Javier Bautista. They then beat the Cayman Islands 4–1 with goals from Bautista, Luis Anaya (2) and Xavier García before winning the return against the Dominican Republic 2–1. They beat the Cayman Islands 4–0 at home, with goals by Víctor Turcios, Steve Purdy, Jaime Alas and Herbert Sosa. The last of these was the thousandth goal scored by the national team. Two comfortable wins over Suriname gave them a perfect record of six wins in six matches.

In the next round, El Salvador snatched a draw against Costa Rica in San José after being 2–0 down, but a home defeat against Mexico four days later precipitated the departure of Israel, whose poor relations with Jaime Rodríguez, the president of the National Institute of Sport Salvador (INDES) were widely known. The Salvadoran Football Association (FESFUT) named the Mexican Juan de Dios Castillo as his replacement.

Despite a good start, a 1–0 win in a friendly match against Guatemala, a 2–2 draw at the Estadio Cuscatlán in a qualifier against modest Guyana earned him the wrath of the public. A 3–2 victory in Georgetown, with a penalty saved by El Salvador's goalkeeper Dagoberto Portillo in additional time, kept their qualifying hopes alive, but these were ended by a 1–0 home defeat against Costa Rica. Juan de Dios Castillo was sacked in November 2012 and replaced on 17 December by the Peruvian Agustín Castillo, a five-time national champion with C.D. FAS.

El Salvador finished third in the 2013 Copa Centroamericana, allowing them to qualify for the 2013 CONCACAF Gold Cup in the United States. In that tournament, a 1–0 win over Haiti allowed them to qualify from the group stages in third place, but they lost 5–1 to the host nation in the quarter-finals.

In 2018 World Cup qualification, El Salvador won knockout ties against Saint Kitts and Nevis and Curaçao to reach the fourth round group stage, but they finished bottom of a group containing Mexico, Honduras and Canada with two draws and four defeats from their six matches.

2020s
After Covid-19 restrictions had loosened up a bit, El Salvador organized a friendly match against the US in December 2020 to start things off again. However, they lost 6–0 to the CONCACAF giants. 2022 FIFA World Cup qualification were soon on the horizon and El Salvador had to play against Grenada and Montserrat in the March 2021 calendar. El Salvador won at home against Grenada in a 2–0 victory and tied with Montserrat in a grueling 1–1 match. This was when El Salvador needed a change fast and they soon sacked Carlos de los Cobos. They hired a Hugo Pérez as their new coach, who was also coaching the El Salvador Sub-23s in the Olympic Qualifiers in the same year. Hugo Perez made radical changes to the team and called up more newer players to help represent El Salvador. When June rolled by, El Salvador's next opponents were the US Virgin Islands and Antigua & Barbudas. El Salvador crushed the Virgin Islands with a 7–0 victory away and won again at home against Antigua in a 3–0 win; El Salvador were on their way to the second round of qualifications. El Salvador then faced off against Saint Kitts & Nevis in a round robin format. El Salvador managed to pull off a 0–4 victory away and a 2–0 victory at home, which got them to the final round of qualifications for the first time in over 10 years. In preparation for the upcoming 2021 CONCACAF Gold Cup, El Salvador organized three friendlies. On June 26, El Salvador played against Guatemala to a 0–0 standstill. However, Hugo Perez was trying to experiment with more younger and less or known players at the time to form an underwhelming B Team. El Salvador then flew to Croatia to face their next opponents. On July 2, La Selecta faced off against NK Istra 1961 to a 2–1 defeat. On July 4, El Salvador faced the Asian Cup winners, Qatar, to a 1–0 defeat.

On July 11, El Salvador played their first game in the 2021 CONCACAF Gold Cup against their Central American rivals, Guatemala, to a 2–0 victory. On July 14, El Salvador faced Trinidad & Tobago to another 2–0 victory to land El Salvador to the Quarter-Finals and gaining 6 points for the first time in the Gold Cup. On July 18, El Salvador played their last game against Mexico to prove how much they've grown or not. El Salvador lost to Mexico in a tense 1–0 defeat. In the quarter-finals, El Salvador faced off against Qatar and lost once again in a 3–2 defeat, ending their Gold Cup run.

Match fixing
The national team has had accusations of several players losing matches on purpose in exchange for monetary rewards. Some of these allegations involved games against Venezuela, Mexico, USA, and Costa Rica. Fourteen players were handed lifetime bans from football on 20 September 2013: Luis Anaya, Osael Romero, Ramón Sánchez, Christian Castillo, Miguel Granadino, Miguel Montes, Dagoberto Portillo, Dennis Alas, Darwin Bonilla, Ramón Flores, Alfredo Pacheco, José Mardoqueo Henríquez, Marvin González, and Reynaldo Hernández. Carlos Monteagudo received a ban of 18 months. Eliseo Quintanilla and Víctor Turcios received six-month bans. Alexander Escobar, Christian Sánchez, and under-20 goalkeeper Yimmy Cuellar received bans of 30 days. After a further 20-day investigation, Rodrigo Martínez was sentenced to a ban of five years, Rodolfo Zelaya to a ban of one year, and Benji Villalobos to a ban of six months.

On 6 September 2016, the team revealed that they had turned down an offer to ensure that their result against Canada saw Honduras progress to the next round of World Cup qualification. Their coach Ramon Maradiaga was later fined 20,000 Swiss francs and banned from football for two years for not disclosing the approach.

Stadium

El Salvador's national stadium is the Estadio Cuscatlán in San Salvador, which saw its first game in 1976.

During the national team's early history, the national stadium was the Campo Marte, 16 acres of land that housed a small stadium, now known as Parque Infantil, between 1928 and 1934. Succeeding, El Salvador played at the Estadio Nacional de la Flor Blanca, now known as Estadio Jorge "Mágico" González, also in San Salvador. It was opened on 19 April 1932 during the presidency of Maximiliano Hernández Martínez in preparation for the 1935 Central American and Caribbean Games. On 24 March 1935 El Salvador played its first game at the Flor Blanca against Cuba and won 4–1. El Salvador played at this stadium during qualification for the 1970 World Cup. On 15 November 2000, a one-off game was played at the stadium, to commemorate a major refurbishment, against Jamaica in the 2002 World Cup qualifiers.

In 1969, EDESSA (Estadios Deportivos de El Salvador Sociedad Anónima) proposed the idea of a new national stadium. This resulted in construction of the Estadio Cuscatlán, with the president of El Salvador, General Fidel Sánchez Hernández, breaking ground on 24 March 1971. The stadium held its first game on 24 July 1976, a friendly between El Salvador and the German Bundesliga champions, Borussia Mönchengladbach. It ended in a 2–0 victory to the German side. The Borussia squad featured players from their 1974 World Cup winning squad, including Berti Vogts, Rainer Bonhof, Wolfgang Kleff and Jupp Heynckes, alongside Allan Simonsen, who later won the 1977 Ballon d'Or and joined Barcelona. El Salvador's team was Tomás Pineda (Mauricio "Tarzán" Alvarenga), Guillermo "Billy" Rodríguez Bou, Ramón Fagoaga, Humberto "Imacasa" Recinos, Eduardo "Conejo" Valdés, Víctor "Pato" Valencia, Warner Solís, Félix "Garrobita" Pineda (César "Piscucha" Acevedo), Luis "Pelé" Ramírez Zapata (Abraham Coreas) & Ismael "Cisco" Díaz (David Cabrera). Borussia also fielded Wolfgang Kneib, Hans-Jürgen Wittkamp, Horst Wohlers, Dietmar Danner, Hans Klinkhammer, Carsten Nielsen and Uli Stielike. Since that match, El Salvador has used the stadium for almost every major home game, and it is also the home ground of Alianza.  On 25 May 1978, EDESSA agreed to sign a 99-year lease of the stadium to CLIMA (Asociación de Clubes de Liga Mayor A) to operate and control which events are held there.

Team image
El Salvador's traditional first kit colour is blue with white trim, their second kit being white with blue trim. The current home and away kit features the traditional colours with the exception of bold curved trims that run from the center of the neck and open to the sides, forming two panels on the chest that contain the Umbro logo and emblem of the Salvadoran Football Federation. At the center of the kit El Salvador national emblem, once again, is shown. The right sleeve shows the national flag.

El Salvador and Mitre announced a new partnership in 2008 that saw them supply the Central American national football team with home and away kits, training, and bench wear until August 2010. Mitre, and their Panamanian partner, The Harari Group, designed the kit that El Salvador used. The kit was showcased by the team on February 11, 2009, as they started their FIFA World Cup qualifying campaign against Trinidad & Tobago in the CONCACAF (Central-American Football Union) Hexagonal Cup. On October 22, 2010, the FESFUT extended the contract with Mitre by four years. The first home and away kit made by Mitre feature a watermark of the country's national shield on the center of the shirt and some horizontal stripes along the kit. The current kit featured white remains along the neck, at the bottom of the kit, and over the shoulders. When this kit was introduced in 2009 it also introduced a new logo that replaced the typical logo of an "E"  and an "S" surrounded by a circle.
Umbro has become the new kit supplier of the El Salvador national football team. Replacing Mitre, the first Umbro El Salvador football kits were released June 15, 2017 and were debuted in the 2017 Gold Cup.

Schedule and results

The following is a list of match results in the last 12 months, as well as any future matches that have been scheduled.

2022

2023

Coaching staff

Coaching history
Since the creation of the national team in 1921, several coaches have been in charge of managing El Salvador. From 1930 to 1935, Mark Scott Thompson was appointed as El Salvador's first ever manager. , the El Salvador national football team has presented itself with 60 managers in the national team. It is reported that all 3 titles (1943, 1954 and 2002) have been won by Salvadoran born managers. Conrado Miranda has managed in 4 different occasions and Armando Contreras Palma in 3. Chilean Hernán Vivanco was manager when El Salvador competed at their first World Cup. Mauricio Rodríguez managed to qualify El Salvador to another World Cup. Rodiguez participated at the 1970 FIFA World Cup.

 Mark Scott Thompson (1930–1935)
 Pablo Ferré Elías (1935–1938)
 Máximo Garay (1940–1941)
 Charlie Slade (1941–1943)
 Américo González (1943–1948)
 Rodolfo Orlandini (1949–1951)
 Marcelo Estrada (1953)
 Carbilio Tomasino (1954–1959)
 Emilio Guardado (1959–1960)
 Conrado Miranda (1961)
 Luis Comitante (1963)
 Hernán Carrasco Vivanco (1965–1967)
 Rigoberto Guzmán (1968)
 Gregorio Bundio (1968–1970)
 Hernán Carrasco Vivanco (1970)
 Conrado Miranda (1971)
 Hector Alfredo D'Angelo (1972)
 Jorge Tupinambá (1973)
 Mauricio Rodríguez (1973–1974)
 Conrado Miranda (1975)
 Marcelo Estrada (1975–1976)
 Raúl Magaña (1976)
 Pinto Beltrao (1976)
 Juan Ricardo Faccio (1977)
 Julio Contreras (1977)
 Ricardo Tomasino (1978)
 Raúl Magaña (1979)
 Salvador Mariona (1979)
 Mauricio Rodríguez (1979–1982)
 Armando Palma (1983)
 Raúl Magaña (1984)
 Juan Quarterone (1984–1985)
 Paulo Roberto Cabrera (1986)
 Raúl Magaña (1987)
 Milovan Đorić (1988)
 Miroslav Vukašinović (1988–1989)
 Conrado Miranda (1989)
 Kiril Dojčinovski (1989)
 Óscar Benítez (1991)
 Jorge Aude (1991)
 Aníbal Ruiz (1992)
 Jorge Vieira (1993)
 Néstor Matamala (1993)
 Ricardo Tenorio (1993)
 Kiril Dojčinovski (1994)
 José Pastoriza (1995–1996)
 Armando Palma (1996)
 Milovan Đorić (1997)
 Kiril Dojčinovski (1998)
 Julio Escobar (1998)
 Marinho Peres (1999)
 Ricardo Tenorio (1999)
 Óscar Benítez (1999–2000)
 Carlos Recinos (2000–2002)
 Juan Ramón Paredes (2002–2004)
 Armando Palma (2004)
 Carlos Cavagnaro (2005)
 Miguel Aguilar (2005–2006)
 Carlos de los Cobos (2006–2009)
 José Luis Rugamas (2010–2011)
 Rubén Israel (2011–2012)
 Juan de Dios Castillo (2012)
 Agustín Castillo (2012–2013)
 Mauricio Alfaro (2014)
 Albert Roca (2014–2015)
 Jorge Rodríguez (2015)
 Ramón Maradiaga (2015–2016)
 Eduardo Lara (2016–2017)
 Carlos de los Cobos (2018–2021)
 Hugo Pérez (2021–present)

Players

Current squad
The following 24 players were called up for the friendly match against Nicaragua on 16 November 2022.

Caps and goals are correct as of 14 June 2022, after the match against United States.

Recent call-ups
The following players have been called up within the last twelve months.

INJ Player withdrew from the current squad due to injury.
COV Player withdrew due to testing positively for COVID-19 or having to self-isolate because of it.
PRE Preliminary squad.
RET Player had announced retirement from international football.
SUS Player is serving a suspension.
WD Withdrawn.

Player recordsPlayers in bold are still active with El Salvador.Competitive record

FIFA World Cup

El Salvador has never advanced beyond the first round of the finals competition. El Salvador declined to participate at the 1950 FIFA World Cup.

CONCACAF Gold Cup

CONCACAF Nations League

Copa Centroamericana

CCCF Championship

Olympic Games

Pan American Games

Central American and Caribbean Games

Central American Games

Head-to-head recordAs of 16 November 2022 after the match against ''.

FIFA ranking history
The following is a chart of the yearly averages of El Salvador's FIFA ranking.

Honours
Major competitions

CONCACAF Championship
 Runners-up (2): 1963, 1981
 Third place (1): 1977

Minor competitions

 Copa Centroamericana
 Third place (6): 1995, 1997, 2001, 2003, 2013, 2017
 CCCF Championship
 Champions (1): 1943 
 Runners-up (2): 1941, 1961
 Third place (1): 1946
 Central American and Caribbean Games
 Champions (1): 1954
 Third place (1): 1935 
 Marlboro Cup
 Third place (1): 1988

Facts
 El Salvador were the first Central American team to qualify for a FIFA World Cup, in 1970, and the first Central American team to qualify twice which they achieved with entry into the 1982 World Cup. They were the first Central American team to ever score a goal in a FIFA World Cup on June 15, 1982. 
 They were the first Central American country to qualify their football team to the Olympic Games (Mexico 1968). 
 They were the first Central American team to sign up for a World Cup qualifier (France 1938).
 They were the first Central American team to be champions of the Central American and Caribbean Games (Mexico 1954). 
 They were also the first Central American team to organize the Central American and Caribbean Games (1935) and the first ever CONCACAF Championship (1963). * El Salvador were also the first Central American team to beat Mexico in Mexico City; by a score of 3–2 at the 1954 Central American and Caribbean Games. Scorers of that game are as follows: Mario Montoya 16' (0–1), Antonio Jasso 27' (1–1), Mario Montoya 36' (1–2), Ricardo Valencia 37' (1–3), Rafael Gutierrez 64' (2–3). The 1st goal in a World Cup qualifier was scored by Joel Estada on 12 December 1968 against Dutch Guiana. 
 The 50th goal in a World Cup qualifier was scored by Ever Hernández in a 1–0 victory—on 2 December 1981—against Mexico. The 100th goal in a World Cup qualifier was scored by Jorge "Mágico" González on 2 May 1993 against Canada. 
 The 150th goal in a World Cup qualifier was scored by Víctor Velásquez in a 2–1 victory—on 13 June 2004—against Bermuda. The 200th goal in a World Cup qualifier was scored by defender Xavier García in a 4–1 victory—on 6 September 2011—against the Cayman Islands.

See also

 El Salvador national under-23 football team
 El Salvador national under-21 football team
 El Salvador national under-17 football team
 List of football clubs in El Salvador
 Primera División de Fútbol Profesional

Notes

References

External links

 Federación Salvadoreña de Fútbol Official site 
 El Salvador national football team (Non-Official site) 
 El Salvador FIFA profile
 El Salvador – Details of World Cup Qualifiers
{https://www.fesfut.org.sv/selecciones/masculinas/}

 
Central American national association football teams